Bébédjia was a village in Logone Oriental Prefecture (now Logone Oriental Region) in Chad which was hit by a tornado on May 9, 2007, killing 14 people and injuring over 100.

References

Destroyed towns
Ghost towns in Africa